50/50 was a British children's television game show for BBC television. Airing on BBC One's children's television block, it was first broadcast on 7 April 1997 and ended its run on 12 July 2005 after 9 series. Repeats aired on BBC One, BBC Two and the CBBC channel until 2009.

Sally Gray hosted the show from its inception until 2002, followed by Angellica Bell until 2004 and Sophie McDonnell in 2005. The voice of the show's computer, named 'Flynn', was provided by Matthew Davies between 1998 and 2000, then by Gary Martin in 2001 and finally by Dave Kelly from 2002 to 2005.

The show featured a competition contested by two teams, each represented by schools, of fifty 11– and 12–year–old pupils who were randomly selected to take part in physical games and quiz rounds to score points. In addition, all players voted in 'true or false' questions to observational rounds. In most series, prizes were awarded to both schools, but a trophy was awarded to the winning team from series 5 onwards.

Format 
The contestants were also the studio audience and sat in raised seating on opposite sides of the studio. The two schools competing were originally represented by the T-shirt colours orange and green before they changed to blue and yellow for the second series in 1998. The contestant numbers were randomly selected, each used once only, for both teams (occasionally one team only) and announced and displayed by a large-screened computer named 'Flynn'. The physical games usually consisted of inflatable obstacle courses, similar to those found in other children's game shows such as Get Your Own Back, Fun House, Run the Risk and Pump It Up. Quiz rounds also featured, as well as an observational round featuring a pop music video in which all contestants played by voting 'true' or 'false' on keypads.

The winning team won a prize for their school, and in later series a glass trophy.

Transmissions

Series

Christmas Specials

References

External links
 
 
 

1990s British children's television series
2000s British children's television series
1997 British television series debuts
2005 British television series endings
BBC children's television shows
BBC Scotland television shows
British children's game shows
1990s British game shows
2000s British game shows
English-language television shows
BBC television game shows
Television series about children
Television series by BBC Studios